Gorytvesica medeter is a species of moth of the family Tortricidae. It is found in Pichincha Province, Ecuador.

The wingspan is 18.5 mm. The wings are dark brown with a rust admixture. The hindwings are grey brown.

Etymology
The species name refers to the differences between the most similar species of this group (Gorytvesica paraleipa and Gorytvesica sychnospina) and is derived from Greek medeteros (meaning none of the two).

References

Moths described in 2005
Euliini
Moths of South America
Taxa named by Józef Razowski